Trichomycterus argos is a species of pencil catfish endemic to Brazil, where it occurs in the Rio Doce basin, situated in the Serra do Brigadeiro range, Minas Gerais. This species reaches a maximum length of  SL.

Habitat and ecology
Under laboratory conditions, it has been observed preying on tadpoles of the Scinax catharinae species group.

References

External links

argos
Fish of the Doce River basin
Endemic fauna of Brazil
Fish described in 2012